Kingston, Sussex may refer to:
 Kingston by Ferring, a civil parish in the Arun district of West Sussex
 Kingston by Sea, an area in the Adur district of West Sussex
 Kingston near Lewes, a village and civil parish in the Lewes district of East Sussex

See also
 Kingston Buci, an electoral division of West Sussex County Council